Veranclassic–Ago is a UCI Continental team founded in 2013 and based in Belgium. It participates in UCI Continental Circuits races.

The team disbanded at the end of the 2016 season.

Major wins 
2015
Stage 5 Tour du Maroc, Justin Jules
Grand Prix de la ville de Nogent-sur-Oise, Robin Stenuit
Stage 1 Tour de Gironde, Robin Stenuit
Memorial Van Coningsloo, Robin Stenuit
2016
Stage 8 Tour du Maroc, Justin Jules
Stage 2 Tour de Tunisie, Justin Jules
Stage 4 Tour de Tunisie, Matthias Legley
Grote Prijs Stad Sint-Niklaas, Justin Jules

References

UCI Continental Teams (Europe)
Cycling teams based in Belgium
Cycling teams established in 2013